Salaries for the world's highest-paid film actors currently range from US$20–40 million, but an actor can earn substantially more by deferring all or part of their salary against a percentage of the film's gross, known within the industry as a "profit participation" deal.

Highest earnings for a single production 
Since not all salaries are made public, this is a non-definitive list of actors who have received $30 million or more as compensation for their services in a single production. Occasionally an actor's fee may cover multiple films, and they are included on the list if the films were filmed as a back-to-back production, as was the case for Keanu Reeves and The Matrix sequels. The figures are given at their nominal value, since earnings from profit-based deals are accumulated over many years, making it infeasible to adjust for inflation.

Highest annual earnings
Forbes publishes yearly lists of the highest-paid actors and actresses based on total earnings from 1 June the previous year to 1 June the current year.

<li style="display: inline-table;">

<li style="display: inline-table;">

See also
 List of highest-grossing actors

References

Film-related lists of superlatives
Lists of film actors
 List
Top people lists
film actors